Coatli is a Nahuatl word meaning "water serpent" or "serpent water" and is the name for several medicinal plants, it can refer to:

Eysenhardtia polystachya, the Mexican kidneywood or palo cuate, used as a traditional diuretic by the Aztec people
Lignum nephriticum, the European name for the traditional diuretic derived from Eysenhardtia polystachya and Pterocarpus indicus
Jatropha dioica, the leatherstem or sangre de drago
Moringa oleifera, the horseradish tree or moringa

See also
Coatl, a Nahuatl word meaning "serpent" or "twin"